Dick Hill was an American audiobook narrator.

Dick Hill has narrated over 1000 audiobooks, and has won three Audie Awards. He is the recipient of a Golden Voices award from AudioFile magazine. He has worked with his wife, Susie Breck, who is also an audiobook narrator and director.

References

External links
Dick Hill's website

Year of birth missing (living people)
Living people
Audiobook narrators
American male voice actors
Place of birth missing (living people)